The Magda Plateau is an uninhabited plain in Qikiqtaaluk, Nunavut, Canada.  It is located in the southern area of Baffin Island's the Borden Peninsula.  The plateau's river valleys traverse over scarps and flat-topped hills. Though part of the peninsula is within Sirmilik National Park, the plateau is outside of its boundaries, to the southwest.

The plateau is characterized as being of clay with components of gravel, gneiss pebbles, alluvial deposits. Flora includes Eriophorum.

References

Plains of Qikiqtaaluk Region